Beach Corner is an unincorporated community in central Alberta in Parkland County, located on Highway 16A,  west of Edmonton. To the east of the settlement is Hubbles Lake, itself surrounded by several waterside resorts.

Beach Corner, Alberta is the site of a notable German Lutheran community.

References

External links
 St. John's Lutheran Church website

Localities in Parkland County